Kyrgyzstan Cup seasons
Cup